"The Parking Space" is the 39th episode of the sitcom Seinfeld. The episode was the 22nd episode of the third season. It aired on April 22, 1992. The story centers on George's protracted struggle with Kramer's friend Mike to claim a parking space they both entered at the same time. The story of the parking confrontation was inspired by a similar incident that happened to writer Greg Daniels' father.

Plot
Kramer tells Jerry about his friend Mike calling Jerry a "phony". George and Elaine borrow Jerry's car to go to a flea market. Kramer is incensed at not having been invited to the outing. After getting into a minor accident, they notice that the car is starting to make a strange clanking noise. In order to soften Jerry's anger over the car damage, Elaine comes up with a wild story about their being pursued by a pack of teenagers with a gun.

George and Elaine look for a parking space near Jerry's building so they can meet him at his apartment to watch a big televised boxing match. George spends a good deal of time positioning himself perfectly (bragging to Elaine about his ability to parallel park) to back into a space. Mike, also there for the fight at Jerry's, enters the same space, front first. The two argue over who is entitled to the space, all the while blocking traffic. Mike argues that he entered the space first, while George argues that he saw it first and that entering front first instead of using the prescribed parallel parking method is illegitimate. People walking by on the street witness the altercation and begin debating the merits of each side. A truck carrying a supply of ice-cream needs to get through, but the two cars are blocking his way, so the driver orders them to move the cars. George and Mike get neutral people to move the cars (since they do not trust each other to do so) and reposition them after the truck has passed.

Jerry and Kramer also come down to try to settle the problem. Jerry inadvertently tells a little boy named Matthew that his father, who owns a "fat free" yogurt store, is closing the store, and the boy gets upset. Kramer mistakenly thinks the boy's mother is pregnant and she becomes outraged. George and Elaine apologize to Kramer for not inviting him to the flea market, but he rejects their apology. Two police officers arrive to resolve the parking situation. However, when one tells Mike to move his car, the other argues in support of Mike, and by then, it is night-time. With George and Mike still arguing, Jerry runs back to his apartment, just in time to see the last few seconds of the count for knockout.

References

External links
 

Seinfeld (season 3) episodes
1992 American television episodes
Television episodes written by Larry David